Mohd Shariff bin Omar is a Malaysian politician. He had served Member of Parliament of Tasek Gelugor from 1990 to 1995 and 1999 to 2004. He was a member of UMNO, a component party of Barisan Nasional (BN). He currently is a member of BERSATU, a component party of Perikatan Nasional (PN).

Political career
Mohd Shariff Omar political career started when he won the State Seat of Sungai Dua of Penang in the 1982 General Election. Prior to this, he had served as Assistant District Officer of Pekan, Pahang in 1972 and continued to serve the State of Perak and Penang until 1982. He then served as a member of the Penang State Legislative EXCO from 1982 until 1990. He was subsequently won the Parliamentary seat of Tasek Gelugor, Penang and appointed as the Parliamentary Secretary to the Minister of Agriculture in 1990 until 1995. In 1995, he was appointed as Deputy Chief Minister of Penang following won the newly created state seat of Permatang Berangan. He returned as a Member of Parliament for another 2 terms from 1999 until 2008 and during that period, he was appointed as Deputy Minister of Agriculture and Agro-Based Industry I. Mohd Shariff was dismissed from UMNO after submitting nomination forms in the 2013 Malaysian general election as an independent candidate for running Parliamentary seat of Tasek Gelugor. Then, he joined the People's Justice Party in 2014. During the establishment of BERSATU in 2016, he was the party's coordinator in Penang. In 2017, he was elected as the permanent chairman of the Bersatu General Assembly until 2020.

Post career
Mohd Shariff Omar currently served as Independent Non-Executive Director of Serba Dinamik Holding Berhads appointed on 9 June 2022.

Election results

Honours
  :
  Medal of the Order of the Defender of the Realm (PPN) (1982)
  Commander of the Order of Loyalty to the Crown of Malaysia (PSM) – Tan Sri (2021)
  :
  Companion of the Order of the Defender of State (DMPN) – Dato' (1994)
  Commander of the Order of the Defender of State (DGPN) – Dato' Seri (1999)
  :
  Knight Commander of the Order of the Crown of Kelantan (DPMK) – Dato' (2002)
  Knight Grand Commander of the Order of Loyalty to the Crown of Kelantan (SPSK) – Dato' (2009)
  :
  Grand Knight of the Order of Sultan Ahmad Shah of Pahang (SSAP) – Dato' Sri (2006)

References

Living people
Year of birth missing (living people)
Former United Malays National Organisation politicians
Malaysian United Indigenous Party politicians
Medallists of the Order of the Defender of the Realm
Commanders of the Order of Loyalty to the Crown of Malaysia